Paulson Kasana Semakula Luttamaguzi (born 25 December 1979), is a Ugandan economist, finance administrator and politician. He is the elected Member of Parliament for Nakaseke South County and a representative for National Unity Platform (NUP), the youngest political party in Uganda. He is a member of the Committee on Finance, Planning and Economic Development and the Appointments Committee in the 10th Parliament of Uganda.

Background and Education 
Paulson born in Nakaseke to Luttamaguzi Mukiibi (the late) and Cissy Nalunkuuma. He went to Kitebi primary school. For secondary, he attended Jinja College briefly, before joining Jinja Secondary School where he completed his O-level. For A-level, he attended Luweero Secondary School. He then pursued a Bachelor of Commerce degree at Makerere University.

See also
Nakaseke District
Democratic Party (Uganda)
Parliament of Uganda

References

External links
 Website of the Parliament of Uganda

Living people
1979 births
Members of the Parliament of Uganda
People from Nakaseke District
People from Central Region, Uganda
Active politicians
Makerere University alumni
Democratic Party (Uganda) politicians